Ivanava District is an administrative subdivision, a raion of Brest Region, in Belarus.  Its administrative center is Ivanava.

Demographics
At the time of the 2009 census, Ivanava District had a population of 43,586. Of these, 95.5% declared Belarusian, 2.2% Ukrainian and 1.8% Russian. 80.9% spoke Belarusian and 17.0% Russian as their native language.

Settlements
Moładava

Notable residents 
 Napoleon Orda (1807-1883), artist known for numerous sketches of historical sites of the former Polish–Lithuanian Commonwealth

References

External links
  

 
Districts of Brest Region